Flann is both an English surname and an Irish masculine given name, but has also been used as a feminine given name. It might refer to:

 Flann Fína mac Ossu, another name for King Aldfrith of Northumbria (died 704 or 705)
 Flann mac Lonáin (died 896), Irish poet
 Flann Sinna (died 916), also called Flann mac Maíl Sechnaill, High King of Ireland
 Flann Mainistrech (died 1056), Irish scholar
 Flann O'Brien, a pen name used by Irish writer Brian O'Nolan (1911–1966)

FLANN, an acronym for Fast Library for Approximate Nearest Neighbors, is a C++ library for approximate nearest neighbor search in high-dimensional spaces.

References

Unisex given names
Irish masculine given names
Irish feminine given names
Irish-language masculine given names
Irish-language feminine given names
Irish-language unisex given names
Masculine given names
Feminine given names
Gaelic-language given names
Surnames of English origin